The 98th Bombardment Wing is an inactive United States Army Air Forces unit. Its last assignment was with the United States Air Force Reserve, based at Bedford Field, Massachusetts. It was inactivated on 27 June 1949.

History
As the 3d Wing, the unit was one of the original wings of the GHQ Air Force on 1 March 1935. It was formed in Texas, reassigned to Barksdale Field, Louisiana. Performed peacetime training operations. Assigned to MacDill Field, Florida, 1940 and assigned to USAAC Southeast Air District, becoming part of III Bomber Command just prior to World War II.

It was deployed to England and was reassigned to VIII Bomber Command in June 1942 as a medium Bomber command and control organization component units being equipped with B-26 Marauders.

It was redesignated as the 98th Combat Bombardment Wing (Medium) in November 1943. The wing was reassigned to Ninth Air Force when 9th was reformed in England as tactical air force to support ground forces in upcoming invasion of France. Performed combat operations supporting allied ground forces until V-E Day

It served postwar as an Air Force reserve unit, 1947–1949.

Lineage
 Authorized on the inactive list as 3d Wing on 24 March 1923
 Redesignated as: 3d Attack Wing in 1929
 Activated on 15 June 1932
 Redesignated as 3d Wing in 1935
 Redesignated 3d Bombardment Wing in 1940
 Inactivated on 5 September 1941
 Activated on 7 June 1942
 Redesignated as: 98th Combat Bombardment Wing (Medium) in November 1943
 Redesignated as: 98th Bombardment Wing (Medium) in June 1945
 Inactivated on 27 November 1945.
 Redesignated 3d Bombardment Wing (Light) and allotted to the reserve
 Activated on 20 December 1946
 Redesignated 3d Air Division (Bombardment) in April 1948
 Inactivated on 27 June 1949

Assignments
 United States Army Air Corps, 15 June 1932
 General Headquarters Air Force, 1 March 1935
 Southeast Air District, 2 October 1940
 III Bomber Command, 5 September 1941
 VIII Bomber Command, 7 June 1942
 VIII Air Support Command, 1943
 IX Bomber Command, 16 October 1943 – 27 November 1945
 United States Air Force Reserve, 20 December 1946 – 27 June 1949

Stations

 Fort Crockett, Texas, 15 June 1932
 Barksdale Field, Louisiana, 27 February 1935
 MacDill Field, Florida, 2 October 1940 – 5 September 1941
 Detrick Field, Maryland, 7 June–August 1942
 Elvedon Hall (AAF-116), England, c. 12 September 1942
 Marks Hall (AAF-160), England, 12 June 1943
 RAF Earls Colne (AAF-358), England, November 1943
 RAF Beaulieu (AAF-408), England, 18 July – 19 August 1944
 Lessay Airfield (A-20), France, 23 August 1944

 Chartres Airfield (A-40), France, 24 September 1944
 Laon/Athies Airfield (A-69), France, 3 October 1944
 Havrincourt, France, 1 February 1945
 Venlo Airfield (Y-55), Netherlands, c. 3 May 1945
 Tienen, Belgium, c. July 1945
 AAF Station Kitzingen, Germany, August 1945
 Namur Airfield, Belgium, c. October–November 1945
 Bedford Field, Massachusetts, 20 December 1946 – 27 June 1949

Components

 GHQ Air Force (Air Force Combat Command, 1941)
 3d Bombardment Group: 1932–1940
 13th Bombardment Group: 1941
 10th Pursuit Group: 1932–1939
 29th Bombardment Group: 1940–1941
 44th Bombardment Group: 1941

 VIII Bomber Command
 322d Bombardment Group:   1 December 1942 – 16 October 1943
 323d Bombardment Group:   1 May – 16 October 1943
 386th Bombardment Group:  3 June – 16 October 1943
 387th Bombardment Group: 25 June – 16 October 1943

 Ninth Air Force
 323d Bombardment Group: 16 October 1943 – 16 July 1945 (B-26 Marauder)
 387th Bombardment Group: 16 October 1943 – November 1945 (B-26 Marauder)
 394th Bombardment Group: 11 March 1944 – September 1945 (B-26 Marauder)
 397th Bombardment Group: 15 April 1944 – November 1945 (B-26 Marauder)
 305th Bombardment Group: 1945 (B-17 Flying Fortress)
 306th Bombardment Group: 1945 (B-17 Flying Fortress)

 Air Force Reserve
 310th Bombardment Group: 1947–1949
 341st Bombardment Group: 1947–1949

References

 Maurer, Maurer (1983). Air Force Combat Units of World War II. Maxwell AFB, Alabama: Office of Air Force History. .
 Johnson, David C. (1988), U.S. Army Air Forces Continental Airfields (ETO), D-Day to V-E Day; Research Division, USAF Historical Research Center, Maxwell AFB, Alabama.

Military units and formations established in 1923
098